Ana Carla is a latin name. It may refer to:

Ana Carla Carrizo (born 1966), Argentine political scientist
Ana Carla Carvalho (born 1991), Brazilian swimmer
Ana Carla de Oliveira Barboza (born 1994), Brazilian footballer